Sang Linggo nAPO Sila (They Are Now On All Week) is a Philippine daily noon-time variety show of ABS-CBN that aired from January 28, 1995, to November 28, 1998, replacement of Eat Bulaga! and followed by Magandang Tanghali Bayan or MTB. It was hosted by the APO Hiking Society (Danny Javier, Jim Paredes and Boboy Garrovillo). Some of the original co-hosts included Kris Aquino, Bing Loyzaga, Michelle van Eimeren, Agot Isidro, Lara Melissa de Leon, Amy Perez, John Estrada, Rannie Raymundo and Roderick Paulate.

The show was a spin-off of ABS-CBN's popular Sunday noon-time show Sa Linggo nAPO Sila. It was one of the new shows launched by the network in 1995 as part of their "Primetime on Daytime" block after Eat Bulaga! moved from ABS-CBN to GMA Network. It aired live daily from ABS-CBN's studio at the Delta Theater until it moved to Studio 3 at the ABS-CBN Broadcast Center in 1997.

First Year: The New Era of Noontime
Sang Linggo nAPO Sila started its first live broadcast from the ABS-CBN Delta Theater on January 28, 1995. The core hosts from the previous show Sa Linggo nAPO Sila (led by the APO Hiking Society) were initially joined by various ABS-CBN contract artists on a twice-weekly basis, until the show established its own core of regular hosts committed to appear on a daily basis.

It garnered high ratings most especially in provinces and cities where ABS-CBN had superior signal. But the real challenge for Sang Linggo was the show's content itself as it tried to veer away from the usual noontime format of slapstick humor and various talent portions that its predecessor (and now competitor on GMA Network) Eat Bulaga!" (which added Allan K., Francis Magalona, Jose Manalo, Donna Cruz, and others to its roster of hosts as well) had presented to its viewers.  Eventually, the show decided to compete for viewership by coming up with various game and talent portions as their answer to their rival show's own tried and tested segments. Among the portions that were a hit to its viewers on its initial year were "Conan the Beautician", "Hibangers", "Pop-Pinoyan", and "Princess Asia".

Soon after, Sang Linggo nAPO Sila became the avenue to showcase talent and introduce new stars. The likes of Rico Yan, Bojo Molina and  Matthew Mendoza were introduced to the public as regular co-hosts. The show's rotating comedy sketch segments won loyal following out of new star combinations like the comic duos of John Estrada and Manilyn Reynes, Roderick Paulate and Jun Encarnacion, and Redford White and Norman Mitchell.

Second Year: Top-rating status and downfall
In the show's second year, it launched "Calendar Girl", a pageant segment for girls aged 15–21 years old. The segment injected a "sexy" element to the show but won over a new fanbase. The noontime show also introduced "Barangay APO", a segment where host Eagle Riggs goes on live remote telecast on a selected barangay and gives out many prizes in cash and kind. The said segment catapulted Sang Linggo nAPO Sila to the number 1 spot in the noontime slot in Mega Manila. But the show's popularity declined when Eat Bulaga! introduced "Super SiReyna", a transgender pageant.  Due to "Super SiReyna"'s phenomenal success in 1996, it catapulted Eat Bulaga! back to the top spot as well as other new segments that capture the attention of its viewers.

Third and Final Year
Sang Linggo nAPO Sila barely celebrated its third year on Philippine TV when the show suddenly suffered in the ratings game. The show was moved to Studio 3 of ABS-CBN Broadcast Center at that time in 1997. With Eat Bulaga! continuing to thrill the noontime viewing public with "Super SiReyna", "Kaserola ng Kabayanan", and "Philippine Bulaga Association", the staff decided to give its still-popular segment "Calendar Girl" a more bolder, naughtier approach. The question-and-answer portion was now handled by the newly established trio of John Estrada, Randy Santiago and Willie Revillame. Their delivery of naughty jokes on national TV was met with mixed reactions. At the same time, the show unveiled its own game portion "APO Cash ng Bayan" which gave out many cash prizes. The ratings improved a bit with the changes but it reportedly did not sit well with some of the original hosts of the show. The show was in danger of cancellation and went its final airing on November 28, 1998, when co-hosts Randy Santiago, John Estrada and Willie Revillame went on to become the main hosts of the network's new noontime show Magandang Tanghali Bayan that aired Mondays to Fridays. The APO Hiking Society, on the other hand, kept the Saturday noontime slot via the musical variety show "Sabado Live". However with "MTB" posting higher ratings after adding the phenomenal segment "Pera o Bayong" later before the year ended, ABS-CBN management decided to cancel "Sabado Live" and extend "MTB"'s run to Saturday. Sabado Live's final show aired on February 27, 1999.

Legacy
Sang Linggo nAPO Sila garnered high ratings from the start of its airing but it was not able to overtake Eat Bulaga! permanently, but it did gain popularity in regions where GMA's signals were weak and ABS-CBN's signals were stronger. The show also introduced many new talents to television. Some of the show's new talents would eventually make their mark in show business as box-office stars and acclaimed artists (recording, film and TV) despite Eat Bulaga’s reported clout and power in the showbiz industry.

However, despite the show's initial advocacy to "clean up" the noontime slot and become the viewer's alternative choice, the management eventually decided that the show must go head-on with Eat Bulaga!. The all-out "noontime network war" escalated as the staff and fans of both warring noontime shows accused each other of copying segments.

The downfall of the show was blamed on the humor being "too intelligent for the average Filipino" as the management tried to request the show's hosts to tone down on jokes (mostly political) that only a few would understand. Apparently, ABS-CBN was looking for a bigger version of its competitor in the noontime slot. After the axing of "APO", succeeding Kapamilya noontime shows would feature younger set of hosts with the same "street humor" inspired by their competitors.

Hosts

Main hosts
Danny Javier
Jim Paredes
Boboy Garovillo

Co-hosts
Manilyn Reynes (1995–1998)
Kris Aquino (1995–1996)
Agot Isidro (1995–1998)
Amy Perez (1995–1998)
Pops Fernandez (1995–1996)
Michelle van Eimeren (1995–1998)
Lara Melissa de Leon (1995–1998)
Bing Loyzaga (1995–1998)
Gelli de Belen (1996–1998)
Aiko Melendez (1996–1998)

Extended hosts
John Estrada (1995–1998)
Roderick Paulate
CJ Ramos
Randy Santiago (1998)
Willie Revillame (1998)
Judy Ann Santos
Claudine Barretto
Rico Yan† (1996–1998)
Kristine Hermosa
Jolina Magdangal (1997–1998)
Rica Peralejo
Giselle Toengi (1998)
Ruffa Gutierrez
Carmina Villaroel
Mark Vernal
Bojo Molina (1996–1998)
Ara Mina
Matthew Mendoza (1996–1997)
Anjo Yllana
Jun Encarnacion†
Eagle Riggs
Rannie Raymundo
Giselle Sanchez
Jon Santos
Bayani Agbayani (1996–1998)
Redford White† (1995–1998)
Norman Mitchell
Solidgold Dancers
Winnie Cordero
Joy Viado†
Joji Isla
Dinky Doo, Jr.
Whitney Tyson
Sammy Lagmay†
Cynthia Patag
Beverly Salviejo
Bentong†
Voice Unlimited

Personnel

Segments
Calendar Girl
Hibangers
Princess Asia
Barangay APO
Sarimanok Sweepstakes
Ricollection
Little Dreamboy
Made na Made Na!
Doon Po sa Jammin'
Hataw ng Tanghalan
Fantasya Festival
Ngiting Unique, Ngiting Panalo (1996–1997)
APO Cash ng Bayan
Dahil Tanging Ikaw Sing-a-like Contest (1996)
Star Kid
Mader Dear

Directors
Danni Caparas
Victor de Guzman

See also
Eat Bulaga!
Magandang Tanghali Bayan
Wowowee
It's Showtime
List of programs broadcast by ABS-CBN

References

External links
'Sang Linggo nAPO Sila at Telebisyon.net

1990s Philippine television series
1995 Philippine television series debuts
1998 Philippine television series endings
ABS-CBN original programming
Philippine variety television shows